Bishop of Ballarat may refer to:

Anglican Bishop of Ballarat
Roman Catholic Bishop of Ballarat